The spotted berrypecker (Rhamphocharis piperata) is a species of bird in the family Melanocharitidae.
It is found in New Guinea. It was formerly considered a subspecies of the thick-billed berrypecker (Rhamphocharis crassirostris), but was split as a distinct species by the IOC in 2021. The name "spotted berrypecker" references the spotted plumage that the female bird has.

Its natural habitat is subtropical or tropical moist montane forests.

References

spotted berrypecker
Birds of New Guinea
spotted berrypecker
spotted berrypecker